Qasemabad (also Romanized as Qāsemābād and Qāsimābād) is a village in Eshqabad Rural District, Miyan Jolgeh District, Nishapur County, Razavi Khorasan Province, Iran. At the 2006 census, its population was 879, in 225 families.

References 

Populated places in Nishapur County